The Athletics Federation of Guinea-Bissau (FAGB; Federação de Atletismo da Guiné-Bissau) is the governing body for the sport of athletics in Guinea-Bissau.  The current president is Renato Moura.

History 
FAGB was founded in 1988, and was affiliated to the IAAF in the year 1991.

Affiliations 
International Association of Athletics Federations (IAAF)
Confederation of African Athletics (CAA)
Asociación Iberoamericana de Atletismo (AIA; Ibero-American Athletics Association)
Moreover, it is part of the following national organisations:
Guinea-Bissau Olympic Committee (Portuguese: Comité Olímpico da Guiné-Bissau)

National records 
FAGB maintains the national records.

External links 
FAGB on Facebook (in Portuguese)

References 

Guinea-Bissau
Sport in Guinea-Bissau
National governing bodies for athletics
Sports organizations established in 1988